Robert Lowell Coover (born February 4, 1932) is an American novelist, short story writer, and T.B. Stowell Professor Emeritus in Literary Arts at Brown University. He is generally considered a writer of fabulation and metafiction.

Background
Coover was born in Charles City, Iowa. He attended Southern Illinois University Carbondale, received his B.A. in Slavic Studies from Indiana University Bloomington in 1953, then served in the United States Navy from 1953 to 1957, where he became a lieutenant. He received an M.A. in General Studies in the Humanities from the University of Chicago in 1965. In 1968, he signed the "Writers and Editors War Tax Protest" pledge, vowing to refuse tax payments in protest against the Vietnam War. Coover has served as a teacher or writer in residence at many universities. He taught at Brown University from 1981 to 2012.

Coover's wife is the noted needlepoint artist Pilar Sans Coover.
They have three children, including Sara Caldwell.

Literary career
Coover's first novel was The Origin of the Brunists, in which the sole survivor of a mine disaster starts a religious cult. His second book, The Universal Baseball Association, Inc., J. Henry Waugh, Prop., deals with the role of the creator. The eponymous Waugh, a shy, lonely accountant, creates a baseball game in which rolls of the dice determine every play, and dreams up players to attach those results to.

Coover's 1969 short story collection Pricksongs and Descants contains the celebrated metafictional story "The Babysitter," which was adapted into the 1995 movie of the same title, directed by Guy Ferland.

Coover's best-known work, The Public Burning, deals with the case of Julius and Ethel Rosenberg in terms that have been called magic realism. Half of the book is devoted to the mythic hero Uncle Sam of tall tales, dealing with the equally fantastic Phantom, who represents international Communism. The alternate chapters portray the efforts of Richard Nixon to stage the execution of the Rosenbergs as a public event in Times Square. As reviewer Thomas R. Edwards wrote in The New York Times, "Astonishingly, Nixon is the most interesting and sympathetic character in the story."

Coover's 1982 novella Spanking the Maid remained one of his favorites; asked in an interview "Which of your books will get you into heaven?", Coover quipped, "Spanking the Maid. God's deep into S&M."  A later novella, Whatever Happened to Gloomy Gus of the Chicago Bears (1987), offers an alternate Nixon, one who is devoted to football and sex with the same doggedness with which he pursued political success in this reality. The theme anthology A Night at the Movies includes the story "You Must Remember This", a piece about Casablanca that features an explicit description of what Rick and Ilsa did when the camera wasn't on them. Pinocchio in Venice returns to mythical themes.

In 1987 he was the winner of the Rea Award for the Short Story. In 2021, Coover, in a collaboration with Art Spiegelman, released Street Cop with Isolarii.

Electronic literature 

Coover was a supporter of early electronic literature, and was one of the founders of the Electronic Literature Organization. He taught electronic literature at Brown University and organized events such as the Technology Platforms for 21st Century Literature (TP21CL), held at Brown in 1999. In 1992 he published the essay "The End of Books" in the New York Times, making a mainstream audience aware of the new genre for perhaps the first time. The "now infamous" essay "roiled the literary scene and declaimed the imminent demise of the novel". Many scholars of electronic literature reference the essay, for instance J. Yellowlees Douglas in the title of her book, The End of Books–Or Books Without End? Reading Interactive Narratives. In 1993, Coover published a second New York Times essay on electronic literature: "Hyperfiction: Novels for the Computer" 

Coover established the MFA program in Digital Language Arts at Brown University, and helped bring a string of writers of electronic literature to the university, including  John Cayley, Talan Memmott, Noah Wardrip-Fruin, William Gillespie and Samantha Gorman. Talan Memmott was Brown University's first graduate fellow of electronic writing.

Bibliography

Novels
The Origin of the Brunists (1966)
The Universal Baseball Association, Inc., J. Henry Waugh, Prop. (1968)
A Political Fable (1968); reprinted as The Cat in the Hat for President: A Fable (2018)
The Public Burning (1977)
Spanking the Maid (1982)
Gerald's Party (1986)
Whatever Happened to Gloomy Gus of the Chicago Bears? (1987)
Pinocchio in Venice (1991)
Dr. Chen's Amazing Adventure (1991)
John's Wife (1996)
Briar Rose (1996)
Ghost Town (1998)
The Adventures of Lucky Pierre: Director's Cut (2002)
The Grand Hotels (of Joseph Cornell) (2002)
Stepmother (2004)
Noir (2010)
The Brunist Day of Wrath (2014)
Huck Out West (2017)
The Enchanted Prince (2018)
 Open House  (2023)

Short fiction
Novelettes
Street Cop (with Art Spiegelman) (2021)

Collections
Pricksongs & Descants (1969)
In Bed One Night & Other Brief Encounters (1983)
A Night at the Movies or, You Must Remember This (1987)
A Child Again (2005)
Going for a Beer: Selected Short Fictions (2018)
Coover Stories (2023)

Uncollected Stories

“Blackdamp.” Noble Savage, no. 4 (October 1961), 218-29.
“The Square Shooter and the Saint: A Story about Jerusalem.” Evergreen Review, no. 25 (July/August 1962): 92-101.
“Dinner with the King of England.” Evergreen Review, no. 27 (November/December 1962): 110-18.
“D.D. Baby.” Cavalier, July 1963, 53-56, 93.
“The Neighbors.” Argosy, January 1966, 129-33.
“Letter from Patmos.” Quarterly Review of Literature, no. 16, 1969, 29-31.
“That the Door Opened.” Quarterly Review of Literature, no. 16, 1969, 311-17.
“The Reunion.” Iowa Review 1.4 (Fall 1970): 64-67.
“Party Talk: Unheard Conversation at Gerald’s Party. Fiction International 18.2 (Spring 1990): 187-203.
“A Sudden Story.” TriQuarterly, no. 78, Spring/Summer 1990, 396.
“Touch.” Paris Review 40.149 (Winter 1998): 155-59.
“The Photographer.” Fence Magazine 2.2 (Fall/Winter 1999-2000): 30-41.
“On Mrs. Willie Masters.” Review of Contemporary Fiction 24.3 (Fall 2004): 10-23.
“Ten Minutes in the Orxatería La Valenciana.” Storie, Afternoon Anthology, no. 42/43, 2008, 227.
“Red-Hot Ruby.” Conjunctions, no. 50, Spring 2008, 450-69.
"The Case of the Severed Hand." Harper's Magazine, June 2008.
"White-Bread Jesus". Harper's Magazine, December 2008.
"The War Between Sylvania and Freedonia." Harper’s Magazine, July 2010, 62-66.
"An Encounter". Fortnightly Review, 2010.
"The Old Man".Fortnightly Review, 2011.
“The Box.” Conjunctions, no. 56, Spring 2011, 221-27.
"Matinée". New Yorker, 25 July 2011, 67-71.
"Vampire". Granta, 21 October 2011.
"The Colonel’s Daughter". New Yorker, 2 September 2013.
"The Frog Prince". New Yorker, 27 January 2014.
"The Waitress". New Yorker, 19 May 2014.
"The Crabapple Tree". New Yorker, 12 January 2015. 
"The Hanging of the Schoolmarm". New Yorker, 28 November 2016.
"The Wall". Conjunctions, no. 68, Spring 2017.
"The Boss". New Yorker, 2 August 2017.
"M*rphed". Granta, 20 October 2017. 
"Treatments". New Yorker, 30 April 2018.
"Hulk". Granta, 10 June 2019. 
"Citizen Punch". New Yorker, 18 July 2019.

Plays 
The Kid (1970) 
Love Scene (1971) 
Rip Awake (1972) 
A Theological Position (1972)

Other 
The Water Pourer (1972) An unpublished chapter from The Origin of the Brunists, signed by author and limited to 300 copies. 22 pages.
  (essay)
 "The Bad Book". On the Bible

Awards and honors

1967 William Faulkner Foundation Award for notable first novel for The Origin of the Brunists
1987 Rea Award for the Short Story
William Faulkner, Brandeis University, American Academy of Arts and Letters, National Endowment of the Arts, Rea Lifetime Short Story, Rhode Island Governor's Arts, Pell, and Clifton Fadiman Awards, Rockefeller, Guggenheim, Lannan Foundation, and DAAD fellowships

See also
 List of electronic literature authors, critics, and works
 Digital poetry
 E-book#History
 Electronic literature
 Hypertext fiction
 Interactive fiction
 Literatronica

References

External links

Faculty Home Page at Brown University
– Interview

The End of Books
– Novelist Robert Coover's keynote address at the Electronic Literature in Europe seminar (elitineurope.net), September 13, 2008. Introduced by Scott Rettberg. Videography by Martin Arvebro.
 Radio Interview
 Bookworm Interviews (Audio) with Michael Silverblatt: December 2005, December 2005

1932 births
Living people
20th-century American novelists
21st-century American novelists
American male novelists
American tax resisters
Brown University faculty
Members of the American Academy of Arts and Letters
Electronic literature critics
Novelists from Iowa
Writers from Providence, Rhode Island
Indiana University Bloomington alumni
Iowa Writers' Workshop faculty
Postmodern writers
People from Charles City, Iowa
The New Yorker people
American male short story writers
20th-century American short story writers
21st-century American short story writers
20th-century American male writers
21st-century American male writers
United States Navy officers
Military personnel from Iowa